Tanne (German for "fir tree") or Tann may refer to:

Tann, Hesse, a city in Hesse
Tann, Bavaria, a town in the district of Rottal-Inn in Bavaria
Tann, Switzerland, a village of the municipality of Dürnten in the canton of Zurich
Tanne, Saxony-Anhalt, a town in the district of Harz in Saxony-Anhalt

People with the surname
 Adam Tann (born 1982), English association football player
 Bert Tann (1914–1972), English association football player and manager
 Georgia Tann (1891–1950), American adoption worker
 Hilary Tann (born 1947), Welsh composer
 John Laurence Tann (born 1890), English rower 
 Malcolm Tann (born 1978), American heavyweight boxer 
 Wesley Tann (1928–2012), American fashion designer
 Willie Tann, English poker player
 Richard Tanne (born 1985), American film director, writer, actor and producer

Also, Tannë was the nickname given to Danish writer Karen Blixen (1885-1962).

See also 
 Von der Tann (disambiguation)
 Tannenbaum (disambiguation), a German synonym for Tanne

German-language surnames